The Adversary is a 2002 French drama film directed by Nicole Garcia, starring Daniel Auteuil and Géraldine Pailhas.

Plot
The film is based on the 2000 book of the same name by Emmanuel Carrère which is inspired by the real-life story of Jean-Claude Romand. L'Adversaire'''s protagonist Jean-Marc Faure (Auteuil) pursues an imaginary career as a doctor of medicine in a plot more closely based on Romand's life and Carrère's book than was Laurent Cantet's 2001 film L'Emploi du Temps''.

Cast 
Daniel Auteuil as Jean-Marc Faure 
Géraldine Pailhas as Christine Faure 
François Cluzet as Luc 
Emmanuelle Devos as Marianne 
Alice Fauvet as Alice 
Martin Jobert as Vincent 
Michel Cassagne as Jean-Marc's father
Joséphine Derenne as Jean-Marc's mother
Anne Loiret as Cécile 
Olivier Cruveiller as Jean-Jacques 
Nadine Alari as Christine's mother
Nicolas Abraham as Xavier 
Bernard Fresson as Christine's father
François Berléand as Rémi
Sibylle Blanc as waitress
Anne Benoît

Accolades
The film was nominated for a Palme d'Or at the 2002 Cannes Film Festival. At the César Awards 2003 Auteuil was nominated as Best actor, François Cluzet as Best supporting actor and Emmanuelle Devos as Best supporting actress.

References

External links 
 
 

2002 films
2000s French-language films
2002 drama films
Films directed by Nicole Garcia
Films scored by Angelo Badalamenti
French drama films
Films based on non-fiction books
Drama films based on actual events
Films about lying
Films set in 1975
Films set in 1989
Films set in 1990
Films set in 1991
Films set in 1992
Films set in 1993
2000s French films